Louisa Frederica Augusta Cavendish, Duchess of Devonshire, formerly Louisa Montagu, Duchess of Manchester (born Luise Friederike Auguste, Countess von Alten; 15 June 1832 – 15 July 1911), was a German-born British aristocrat sometimes referred to as the "Double Duchess" due to her marriages, firstly to the 7th Duke of Manchester and then to the 8th Duke of Devonshire.

Early life
Luise Friederike Auguste, Countess von Alten, was born 15 June 1832 at Hanover in what was then the Kingdom of Hanover. She was a daughter of Karl Franz Viktor, Count von Alten (1800–1879), and his wife, Hermine von Schminke (1806–1868). Her siblings included: Helene Charlotte Auguste, Countess of Alten, who married Andrei Bludov, Carl Friedrich Franz Victor, Count of Alten, who married Carolina Frederica Groeninx van Zoelen, and Guidobaldine, Countess of Alten, who married Graf August Grote and Don Luigi Maria Colonna, Prince of Stigliano, and Detlof von Bülow.

Her paternal grandparents were Adolf Viktor Christian Jobst, Count von Alten (1755–1820), and Charlotte Louise Wilhelmine Kinsky von Wchinitz und Tettau.

Mistress of the Robes

"A social climber with a nose for power", the 26-year-old Duchess (through her friendship with Lord Derby, the then prime minister) was appointed Mistress of the Robes to Queen Victoria in February 1858, resigning in June 1859, when Lord Derby's government fell. Victoria regretted her departure, calling her "a very pleasant, nice, sensible person". The Duchess soon developed close friendships with Edward, Prince of Wales and Alexandra, Princess of Wales.

Lady Eleanor Stanley recorded in her diary in 1859 that during a "paper chase", the Duchess caught her hoop while climbing over a stile and was left with the entirety of her crinoline and skirts thrown over her head, revealing her scarlet drawers to the assembled company. The Duc de Malakoff, the French ambassador, is said to have exclaimed "C'était diabolique!" at the sight.

Devonshire House Ball of 1897
In July 1897, the Duchess hosted the Devonshire House Fancy Dress Ball at Devonshire House, the London residence of the Dukes of Devonshire during the 18th and 19th centuries. The party was a costume ball thrown to celebrate Queen Victoria's diamond jubilee. The Queen's Private Secretary, Francis Knollys, wrote to the Duchess that the Prince of Wales (who dressed as the Grand Master of the Knights of Malta) thought the party a success. At the ball, the Duchess dressed as Queen Zenobia of Palmyra.

Marriages and issue

On 22 July 1852, the twenty-year-old Louisa was married in Hanover to Viscount Mandeville, eldest son and heir of the 6th Duke of Manchester. Upon his father's death on 8 August 1855, he succeeded his father as 7th Duke of Manchester, and Louisa became Duchess of Manchester.

They had five children: 
 George Victor Drogo Montagu, 8th Duke of Manchester (1853–1892), who married Consuelo Yznaga (1853–1909), and had issue.
 Lady Mary Louisa Elizabeth Montagu (1854–1934), who was born at Kimbolton Castle and married, firstly, to William Douglas-Hamilton, 12th Duke of Hamilton, at Kimbolton Castle on 10 December 1873, and had issue. She secondly married on 20 July 1897 to Robert Carnaby Forster of Easton Park, Wickham Market, Suffolk (d. 1925), without issue.
 Lady Louisa Augusta Beatrice Montagu (1856–1944), born at Kimbolton Castle. She married Archibald Acheson, 4th Earl of Gosford, on 10 August 1876 in London, and had issue.
 Lord Charles William Augustus Montagu (1860–1939), who married the Hon. Mildred Cecilia Harriet Sturt (1869–1942), daughter of Henry Sturt, 1st Baron Alington, at Kimbolton Castle on 4 December 1930. He had no issue.
 Lady Alice Maude Olivia Montagu (1862–1957), born in London. She married Edward Stanley, 17th Earl of Derby, on 5 January 1889 in London, and had issue.

Louisa became estranged from the Duke, and they lived apart for many years. Louisa became the companion of Spencer Cavendish, Marquess of Hartington, and a notable political hostess. The Duke died in Naples on 22 March 1890.

On 16 August 1892, at Christ Church, Mayfair, the sixty-year-old Dowager Duchess of Manchester married Lord Hartington, by then the 8th Duke of Devonshire. She thereby became Duchess of Devonshire, with a nickname of the "Double Duchess".

After the Duke of Devonshire's death on 24 March 1908, she was widowed for the second time, becoming the Dowager Duchess of Devonshire. On 15 July 1911, at the Sandown Races in Esher Park, the Duchess died after a seizure, aged 79; she was interred at Edensor in Derbyshire.

Gallery

References
Notes

Sources

External links

 The Cavendish Story: The Double Duchess 

1832 births
1911 deaths
German countesses
Louisa Cavendish, Duchess of Devonshire
Louisa Cavendish, Duchess of Devonshire
English duchesses by marriage
Mistresses of the Robes to Queen Victoria
Nobility from Hanover
Wives of knights